Live in Europe may refer to:

 Live in Europe (Otis Redding album), 1967
 Live in Europe (Rory Gallagher album), 1972
 Live in Europe (Creedence Clearwater Revival album), 1973
 Live in Europe (Leo Kottke album), 1980
 Live in Europe (Curtis Mayfield album), 1988
 Live in Europe (Dave Douglas album), 1997
 Live in Europe (Mara! album), 2001
 Live in Europe (Transatlantic album), 2003
 Live in Europe (The Flock album), 2004
 Live in Europe (Kultur Shock album), 2007
 Live in Europe (Flying Colors album), 2013
 Live in Europe (Billy Paul album), 1974
 Live in Europe (Local H album), 2017
 Live in Europe (Fred Hersch album), 2018
  Live in Europe (Melody Gardot album), 2018
 Live in Europe, a 1979 album by Burl Ives
 Pink: Live in Europe, a 2006 live music DVD by Pink
 Live in Europe 1993 by Deep Purple
 Live in Europe, U.S. release of  Live in Germany 1976 by Rainbow
 Live in Europe (José González album), by José González and String Theory, 2019

See also
 In Europe (disambiguation)